Bangladeshi Australians refers to Australian citizens or residents who have full or partial Bangladeshi heritage or people who emigrated from Bangladesh and reside in Australia. There are around 53,000 Bangladeshis in Australia, according to the census in 2012. The largest Bangladeshi communities are mainly present in the states of New South Wales and Victoria, with large concentrations in the cities of Sydney and Melbourne.

History
Bangladeshis are relatively new migrants to Australia. Since 1970s, migration from Bangladesh has steadily increased with the majority arriving under the Skilled Migration Program. Most Bangladesh-born have settled in the urban areas of New South Wales while smaller numbers settled in other states and territories.

Demography
The latest Census in 2011 recorded 27,809 Bangladesh-born people in Australia, an increase of 72.8 per cent from the 2006 Census. The 2011 distribution by state and territory showed New South Wales had the largest number with 17,007, followed by Victoria (5114), Queensland (1672) and Western Australia (1496).

Notable people
 Tanveer Ahmed – Journalist, television personality and psychiatrist, columnist for the Sydney Morning Herald.
 Ishraq Huda – Champion at the International Olympiad in Informatics 2014, held in Taiwan.
 Aamer Rahman – Comedian

See also

 Australia–Bangladesh relations
 Bangladeshi diaspora
 Indian diaspora
 Indian Australians
 Pakistani Australians

References

External links
 PriyoAustralia.com.au The gateway for information on all aspects of the growing Bengali community in Australia. (1st community news portal in Australia)
 Bangla-Sydney.com (News and views of Bangladeshi community in Sydney)
 Gaan Baksho (Australia's 24/7 HD Bangla radio & Event platform)
 Bangladesh’s Moazzem best teacher in Australian university

 
Bangladeshi diaspora